The Roman Catholic Archdiocese of Abidjan is the Metropolitan See for the Ecclesiastical province of Abidjan in Côte d'Ivoire.

History
 June 28, 1895: Established as Apostolic Prefecture of Costa d'Avorio from the Apostolic Prefecture of Gold Coast in Ghana
 November 17, 1911: Promoted as Apostolic Vicariate of Costa d'Avorio
 April 9, 1940: Renamed as Apostolic Vicariate of Abidjan
 September 14, 1955: Promoted as Metropolitan Archdiocese of Abidjan

Special churches
The seat of the archbishop is St. Paul's Cathedral in Abidjan.

Bishops
 Prefect Apostolic of Ivory Coast (Latin Rite)
 Fr. Jules-Joseph Moury, S.M.A. (18 January 1910 – 17 January 1911); see below
 Vicars Apostolic of Ivory Coast (Latin Rite)
 Jules-Joseph Moury, S.M.A. (17 January 1911 – 29 March 1935); see above
 François Person, S.M.A. (9 December 1935 – 8 July 1938)
 Jean-Baptiste Boivin, S.M.A. (15 March 1939 – 9 April 1940); see below
 Vicar Apostolic of Abidjan (Latin Rite)
 Jean-Baptiste Boivin, S.M.A. (9 April 1940 – 14 September 1955); see above & below
 Metropolitan Archbishops of Abidjan (Latin Rite)
 Jean-Baptiste Boivin, S.M.A. (1955.09.14 – 1959.06.10); see above
 Bernard Yago (1960.04.05 – 1994.12.19); Cardinal in 1983
 Bernard Agré (1994.12.19 – 2006.05.02); Cardinal in 2001
 Jean-Pierre Kutwa (since 2006.05.02); Cardinal in 2014

Auxiliary bishops
Laurent Yapi (1970-1979), appointed Bishop of Abengourou
Paul Dacoury-Tabley (1979-1994), appointed Bishop of Grand-Bassam
Joseph Yapo Aké (2001-2006), appointed Bishop of Yamoussoukro

Other priest of this diocese who became bishop
 Bernard Agré, appointed Bishop of Man in 1968; later returned here as Archbishop; future Cardinal

Suffragan Dioceses
 Agboville
 Grand-Bassam
 Yopougon

See also
 Roman Catholicism in Côte d'Ivoire
 List of Roman Catholic dioceses in Côte d'Ivoire

Sources
 GCatholic.org

References

Roman Catholic dioceses in Ivory Coast
Organizations based in Abidjan
Religious organizations established in 1895
Roman Catholic dioceses and prelatures established in the 19th century
1895 establishments in French West Africa
1895 establishments in Ivory Coast
A